Alexandru Grigoraș Pantea (born 11 September 2003) is a Romanian professional footballer who plays as a full-back for Liga I club FCSB.

Club career
A youth exponent of his hometown side FCSB, Pantea made his professional debut by starting in a 2–2 Liga I draw with Gaz Metan Mediaș on 21 June 2020. In the process, he became the first player born in 2003 to play in the top flight.

On 7 July 2021, Pantea was sent out on loan to Liga II team Hermannstadt for an undisclosed period. He featured in 28 matches and gained Liga I promotion, before returning to his parent club in the summer of 2022.

International career
Pantea made his full debut for Romania on 20 November 2022, aged 19, after coming on for Cristian Manea in the 70th minute of a 5–0 away thrashing of Moldova.

Style of play
A full-back, Pantea's ambidexterity makes him capable of operating on both the left and the right sides of the field.

Career statistics

Club

International

Honours
FCSB
Cupa României: 2019–20
Supercupa României runner-up: 2020

References

External links

FCSB official profile 

2003 births
Living people
Footballers from Bucharest
Romanian footballers
Association football fullbacks
Liga I players
Liga II players
Liga III players
FC Steaua București players
FC Hermannstadt players
Romania youth international footballers
Romania international footballers